Anytime with Bob Kushell is a five-minute talk show produced for Sony Pictures Television and their online portal "Crackle.com".  The show consists of a single monologue joke, a field-piece/desk bit, and a celebrity interview.  It is hosted by Emmy-nominated writer Bob Kushell, who co-created the series with Russell Arch. Arch also directed all of the episodes.  The show features a "house band" consisting of members from The Four Postmen, as well as writer Ron Rappaport.

Anytime with Bob Kushell was conceived after Kushell and Arch produced a popular video entitled The Strike, Your Marriage, and You and a behind-the-scenes "sequel" The Healing during the 2008 Writers Guild of America Strike.

Two "pilots" were produced in April 2008, and subsequently sold a 26 episode season that started airing on December 18, 2008 and will continue through June 2009.

The show is taped in an actual 17' x 18' garage in Van Nuys, California.

Episodes

Season 1

Season 2

References

Crackle (streaming service) original programming